Nagam is a town and municipality in Budgam district of the Indian union territory of Jammu and Kashmir. The town is located 16 kilometres from district headquarters Budgam.

Demographics
According to the 2011 census of India, Nagam has 569 households. The literacy rate of Nagam was 65.66% compared to 67.16% of Jammu and Kashmir. In Nagam, Male literacy stands at 78.59% while the female literacy rate was 51.95%.

Transport

Rail
The nearest railway stations to Nagam is Budgam railway station located at a distance of 17 kilometres.

Air
The nearest airport is Srinagar International Airport located at a distance of 17 kilometres and is a 45-minute drive.

See also
 Bagati Kani Pora
 Dooniwari
 Budgam
 Jammu and Kashmir
 Doodhpathri

References

Cities and towns in Budgam district